The James Parker House is a historic house on Center Road in Shirley, Massachusetts.  The oldest portion of this -story wood-frame house was built c. 1720, and probably consisted of a typical First Period three bay structure with a large chimney.  The house was enlarged to its present five bay width in 1797 by James Parker, a noted local resident.  The house stands at the end of an 18th-century road, and is one of the few 18th-century buildings left in Shirley.

The house was added to the National Register of Historic Places in 1988.

See also
National Register of Historic Places listings in Middlesex County, Massachusetts

References

Houses on the National Register of Historic Places in Middlesex County, Massachusetts